Ahoueke Steeve Kévin Denkey (born 30 November 2000) is a Togolese professional footballer who plays as a forward for Cercle Brugge and the Togo national team.

Club career
Denkey was born in Togo and moved to France at a young age, and joined the Nîmes youth academy in 2014. He made his professional debut for Nîmes in a 0–0 Ligue 2 tie with Le Havre on 13 January 2017.

He joined Béziers on a six-month loan in January 2019.

Denkey joined Cercle Brugge in 2021.

International career
Denkey represented the Togo U20s at the 2018 Toulon Tournament, and scored two goals in three games.

Denkey made his debut for the Togo senior national team in a 0–0 2019 Africa Cup of Nations qualification tie with Benin on 9 September 2018.

Career statistics

International
Scores and results list Togo's goal tally first, score column indicates score after each Denkey goal.

References

External links
 
 

2000 births
Living people
Sportspeople from Lomé
Togolese footballers
Togo international footballers
Togo youth international footballers
Association football forwards
Nîmes Olympique players
AS Béziers (2007) players
Cercle Brugge K.S.V. players
Ligue 1 players
Ligue 2 players
Championnat National 2 players
Championnat National 3 players
Belgian Pro League players
Togolese expatriate footballers
Togolese expatriate sportspeople in France
Expatriate footballers in France
Togolese expatriate sportspeople in Belgium
Expatriate footballers in Belgium
21st-century Togolese people